The Peaceful Tour Live is a collection of Howard Jones songs performed live and with full electronics, released in 2001. Many of the hits included were revamped with contemporary electro elements, most notably You Know I Love You Don't You? Robin Boult accompanied Howard on electric guitar for this tour and Shaz Sparks sung backing vocals and the chorus on the track All I Want.

Track listing
"Conditioning" – 6:01
"New Song" – 4:49
"Like To Get To Know You Well" – 5:19
"Collective Heartbeat" – 7:17
"Hide And Seek" – 6:09
"All I Want" – 5:37
"Hunt The Self" – 3:59
"Let The People Have Their Say" – 5:12
"You Know I Love You...Don't You?" – 4:55
"Things Can Only Get Better" – 7:10
"What Is Love?" – 5:30

References

Howard Jones (English musician) albums
2001 live albums